This is a list of canal tunnels in the United Kingdom.

Listed by name

Navigatable adits and mine levels
An adit is a horizontal entrance to a mine:

Listed by canal

Grand Union Canal
Blisworth Tunnel, Northamptonshire
Braunston Tunnel, Northamptonshire
Crick Tunnel, Northamptonshire
Husbands Bosworth Tunnel, Leicestershire
Saddington Tunnel, Leicestershire
Shrewley Tunnel, Warwickshire

Peak Forest Canal
Hyde Bank Tunnel
Woodley Tunnel

Regent's Canal
Islington Tunnel
Lisson Grove Tunnel
Maida Hill Tunnel

Union Canal (Scotland)
Falkirk Tunnel, Falkirk
Roughcastle Tunnel, Falkirk. Part of the Falkirk Wheel complex; leads to Locks 1 & 2 and South Basin

See also

Canals of Ireland
Canals of the United Kingdom
History of the British canal system
Legging (canals)
List of canals
List of canal aqueducts in the United Kingdom
List of canal basins in Great Britain
List of canal junctions in the United Kingdom
List of canal locks in the United Kingdom
List of tunnels
List of tunnels in the United Kingdom

References

Bibliography

External links

Canal tunnels of London

Canal tunnels in Great Britain
United Kingdom, canal
 
Canal